Nara 1st district (奈良[県第]1区 Nara[-ken dai-]ikku) is a single-member electoral district for the House of Representatives, the lower house of the National Diet of Japan. It is located in Northern Nara and consists of the prefectural capital Nara City without the former village of Tsuge that is part of Nara 2nd district. As of September 2012, 296,007 voters were registered district, giving its voters above-average vote weight.

The current representative from the district is Sumio Mabuchi who became a minister of state in the Kan Cabinet in 2010.

List of representatives

Election results

References 

Nara Prefecture
Districts of the House of Representatives (Japan)